The 2022–23 WBBL season will be the 9th season of the Women's British Basketball League, the top British women's professional basketball league, since its establishment in 2014. The season featured 12 teams from across England, Scotland and Wales.

Teams

WBBL Championship
Each team will play each other once home and once away for a 22-game regular season. The top 8 teams will qualify for the post-season playoffs.

Standings

WBBL Cup
The 2022-23 WBBL Cup will be a straight knockout competition featuring all twelve clubs. The top 4 teams from the 2021-22 WBBL Championship (London Lions, Sevenoaks Suns, Sheffield Hatters and Leicester Riders) received a bye to the quarter-finals. The remaining teams were seeded based on their finishing positions in the 2021-22 WBBL Championship.

First round

Quarter-finals

Semi-finals

Final

References

External links

Seasons in British basketball leagues
2022–23 in European women's basketball leagues
2022 in British women's sport
2023 in British women's sport